Thomas Nelson "Nellie" Metcalf (September 21, 1890 – January 17, 1982) was an American football and basketball player, track athlete, coach of football and track, professor of physical education, and college athletics administrator.  He served as the head football coach at Columbia University (1915–1917) as well as his alma mater, Oberlin College (1913, 1919–1921), compiling a career college football record of 33–13–4.  From 1924 to 1933, Metcalf taught at Iowa State University in the physical education department and served as the school's athletic director.  He then moved on to the University of Chicago, where he was the athletic director from 1933 to 1956.  At Chicago, he replaced Amos Alonzo Stagg, who was forced into retirement at the age of 70 after 40 years of service as the school's athletic director and head football coach.

Head coaching record

References

External links
 Oberlin College Hall of Fame profile

1890 births
1982 deaths
American football ends
American football tackles
Chicago Maroons athletic directors
College men's track and field athletes in the United States
College track and field coaches in the United States
Columbia Lions football coaches
Iowa State Cyclones athletic directors
Iowa State University faculty
Minnesota Golden Gophers football coaches
Oberlin College faculty
Oberlin Yeomen basketball players
Oberlin Yeomen football coaches
Oberlin Yeomen football players
People from Elyria, Ohio
Sportspeople from Greater Cleveland
Sportspeople from Santa Barbara, California
Players of American football from Ohio
American men's basketball players